Mabang is a town in the Ahafo-Ano District of the Ashanti Region of Ghana.

References

Ashanti Region
Villages in Ghana